The California Little Hoover Commission (LHC), officially the Milton Marks "Little Hoover" Commission on California State Government Organization and Economy, is an independent California state oversight agency modeled after the Hoover Commission and created in 1962, that investigates state government operations and promotes efficiency, economy and improved service through reports, recommendations and legislative proposals.

Created by SB 37 in 1993, the California State Auditor operates under the direction of the Little Hoover Commission.

See also 
 California Law Revision Commission

References

External links 
 

State agencies of California
Government agencies established in 1962
1962 establishments in California